William Henry Fox (August 29, 1837 – May 14, 1913)  was a Massachusetts  lawyer, jurist, and politician who served as the fourth Mayor of Taunton, Massachusetts, and as the Presiding Justice of the First Bristol District Court.

Notes 

 
 
 

1837 births
1913 deaths
Massachusetts lawyers
Mayors of Taunton, Massachusetts
Harvard University alumni
19th-century American politicians
19th-century American lawyers